is a Japanese footballer who plays as a defender for J2 League club Blaublitz Akita.

Club statistics
Updated to 3 December 2022.

References

External links
Profile at FC Ryukyu
Profile at Toyama
Profile at Sagamihara
Profile at Akita

1993 births
Living people
Tokyo International University alumni
Association football people from Tokyo
Japanese footballers
J2 League players
J3 League players
FC Ryukyu players
Kataller Toyama players
SC Sagamihara players
Blaublitz Akita players
Association football forwards